Balinese traditional house refers to the traditional vernacular house of Balinese people in Bali, Indonesia. The Balinese traditional house is the product of a blend of Hindu and Buddhist beliefs, fused with Austronesian animism, resulting in a house that is "in harmony" with the law of the cosmos of Balinese Hinduism.

House compound
The Balinese traditional house is built as a house compound, where daily functions are separated not by rooms, but by individual structures within an enclosing wall.

See also

Balinese architecture

References

Citations

Works cited

External links 
  

Rumah adat
Balinese culture
House types